Micheen Barbara Thornycroft  (born 26 June 1987), is a Zimbabwean female rower. Born in Harare, she competed at the 2012 Summer Olympics and the 2016 Summer Olympics in the single scull events for the national team.

Thornycroft's achievements in the sporting discipline have seen her being nominated for the ANSA (Annual National Sports Award) Sportswoman of the Year Award twice, in 2013 and in 2015.

Early life and education
Thornycroft was born on 26 June 1987 in Harare, Zimbabwe. She has an older sister, Roseanne, and a younger brother, Patrick. Initially home-schooled for Grade One, Thornycroft went to Springvale House, an independent school in Mashonaland East for primary schooling and on to Peterhouse Girls' School, another independent school also in Mashonaland East, for her secondary education. Peterhouse was the school where she began rowing and met her coach, Rachel Davis.

Thornycroft did her tertiary education in South Africa. At Rhodes University in Grahamstown, Eastern Cape, she read human kinetics and ergonomics, and ichthyology and fisheries studies for her undergraduate education. She then did her Honours in ichthyology and fisheries studies. Thornycroft was also president of the Rowing Club and in 2009, she won the Sportswoman of the Year Award at the Rhodes University Sports Council Awards Dinner. Afterward, she went on to do a postgraduate in Teaching at the University of Johannesburg in Johannesburg, Gauteng.

She married fellow Zimbabwean Olympic rower Peter Purcell-Gilpin in 2019 after years of serving as training partners.

Career

2011
In November, Thornycroft qualified for the 2012 London Olympic Games by finishing first in the women's single sculls at the Africa Continental Qualification Regatta held in Alexandria, Egypt. Male counterpart, James Fraser-Mackenzie, also qualified for the Olympics after the finishing second in the Final B race at the same regatta.

2012
In the buildup to the Olympic Games, Thornycroft went on to compete in the Paulo D'Alorja regatta held in Italy, she attained sixth place in Final A race. At the World Rowing Cup II, in Lucerne, Switzerland, (from the 25th-27 May) Thornycroft finished tenth overall. She participated in the 2012 Samsung World Rowing Cup III, held in Munich, Germany (from the 15–17 June) and came first in the Final C race (a non-medal race) and thirteenth overall. At the 2012 Summer Olympics in London, Great Britain, Thornycroft managed to attain fourteenth place overall as she finished second in the Final C race.

2013
In 2013, Thornycroft raced at the World Rowing Cup in Sydney and attained first place in the Final B race (a non-medal race). She had training camps in Italy and Germany before participation at the 2013 World Rowing Championships in Chungju, South Korea where she finished fourth in the Final B race. Micheen won gold at the African Rowing Championships in the single sculls in Tunisia.

2014
In April, Thornycroft came out sixth at the Paulo D'Alorja regatta held in Italy. In June, at the World Rowing Cup II in Aiguebelette, France, Micheen finished second in the Final C race. At the 2014 World Rowing Championships held in Amsterdam, Netherlands, Thornycroft achieved a second-place finish in the Final D race and nineteenth overall. She was one of ten Zimbabwean athletes to receive an Olympic Solidarity scholarship to aid preparations for the 2016 Summer Olympics in Rio de Janeiro, Brazil. Micheen came first in the women's single sculls event at the 10th African Rowing Championships (which ran from 16–18 October) held at the Boukerdane Dam in Sidi Amar, Tipaza, a town in northern Algeria.

2015
In a bid to intensify her preparations for the qualifying phase to compete in the 2016 Summer Olympics hosted by Rio de Janeiro in Brazil, Thornycroft moved to Pretoria, the South African capital, so as to train at the High Performance Centre (HPC), at the University of Pretoria, a renowned sport science and training facility. Thornycroft trained under the guidance and coaching of Roger Barrow, South African National Rowing coach credited with coaching the South African M4x (Men's lightweight coxless four) crew that won gold at the 2012 London Olympic Games. Under Barrow's tutelage, Thornycroft set her personal best three times (at the SA Rowing Championships, World Rowing Cup III and the 2015 World Rowing Championships). She won gold at the women's single sculls at the SA Rowing Championships and attained Final B race finishes at the World Rowing Cup III in Lucerne, Switzerland and the World Rowing Championships in Aiguebelette, France where she was fifth and sixth respectively. Micheen came first in the women's single sculls event at the 2015 African Continental Qualification Regatta in Tunis, Tunisia and as a result, qualified for the 2016 Olympics.

2016
In February, Thornycroft participated in the women's single sculls event at the Buffalo Regatta in East London, Eastern Cape, South Africa, where she finished first.

Recognition
Thornycroft was nominated for an ANSA (Annual National Sports Award) Sportswoman of the Year Award in 2013, with two other nominees, Cara Black (tennis player) and Rachel Goromonzi (hockey player) also being recognised as deserving of the award. The event was held at the Rainbow Towers Hotel in Harare on 11 December. Thornycroft received a silver medal for the accolade whilst Black and Goromonzi received gold and bronze medals respectively.

In 2015, Thornycroft was again nominated for an ANSA Sportswoman of the Year Award. The other nominees were Kirsty Coventry (swimmer) and Helen Costa Sinclair (bodybuilder). The award show was on 16 December, hosted by the Sports and Recreation Commission at the Rainbow Towers Hotel in Harare. The accolade was given to Helen Costa Sinclair.

Philanthropy
In 2012, Thornycroft was part of a team of rowers taking part in the rowing edition of the Ubunye Challenge. The 24-hour rowing challenge was an initiative expecting to raise £250,000 to finance educational projects in South Africa and Zimbabwe.

See also

 Zimbabwe at the 2012 Summer Olympics § Rowing
 Zimbabwe at the 2016 Summer Olympics § Rowing

References

External links

 
 
  on WorldRowing.com
  on Sports-Reference.com
  with School Sports Network

1987 births
Living people
Zimbabwean female rowers
Alumni of Peterhouse Girls' School
Rhodes University alumni
University of Johannesburg alumni
Zimbabwean people of British descent
White Zimbabwean sportspeople
Sportspeople from Harare
Rowers at the 2012 Summer Olympics
Rowers at the 2016 Summer Olympics
Olympic rowers of Zimbabwe